Route 450 is a  long mostly west–east secondary highway in the northwest portion of New Brunswick, Canada.

The route's western terminus starts at the merged highways Route 134 and Route 8 west of the community of Lavillette.  travels east through the community of Lavillette before taking a 45 degree turn north.  The road then takes a 90 degree turn East at the intersection of Route 455 travelling through the community of Saint-Wilfred before turning south passing by Drisdelle Settlement before entering the community of Lagaceville.  The road briefly turns east before the intersection of Route 445 before its last stretch south to the community of Village-Saint-Laurent at the intersection of Route 11.

History

See also

References

450
450